Morphomordellochroa is a genus of beetles in the family Mordellidae, containing the following species:

 Morphomordellochroa guineensis Ermisch, 1969
 Morphomordellochroa testacea Ermisch, 1969

References

Mordellidae